Ramya Behara is an Indian playback singer who works predominantly in Telugu films. She has sung over 180 songs in Telugu, Kannada, Tamil and Hindi films. "Dhivara" song from the Telugu film Baahubali: The Beginning (2015) was her breakthrough.

Early life and career
Behara was born in Narasaraopet, Guntur district, Andhra Pradesh, India and was raised in Hyderabad. She stated that her passion for singing began when she was in seventh grade. She went to Little Music Academy and was trained under Ramachary. 

Behara's first song was recorded for a Telugu film Vengamamba. She was introduced to films by M. M. Keeravani.

Discography

Awards and nominations

References

External links 

1994 births
Living people
People from Guntur district
Indian women playback singers
Telugu playback singers
Bollywood playback singers
Tamil playback singers
Women musicians from Andhra Pradesh
21st-century Indian women singers
21st-century Indian singers
South Indian International Movie Awards winners
CineMAA Awards winners
Kannada playback singers